The Michigan State Spartans men's soccer team represents Michigan State University in all men's Division I NCAA soccer competitions. They compete in the Big Ten Conference. The team has made nineteen appearances in the NCAA Men's Division I Soccer Tournament with the most recent coming in 2018 NCAA Division I Men's Soccer Tournament. They won two co-national championships in 1967 (with Saint Louis) and 1968 (with Maryland) when led by Gene Kenney.

Roster

Notable alumni 

 Fatai Alashe
 Zach Carroll
 Jay Chapman
 Buzz Demling
 Timothy Granaderos
 Greg Janicki
 Nick Krat
 Ken Krolicki
 Alex Skotarek
 DeJuan Jones

References

External links 

 

 
Michigan State Spartans
1956 establishments in Michigan
Association football clubs established in 1956